The Songs of the Tyne is a chapbook of Geordie dialect songs, consisting of ten small volumes, and published c. 1846. It was the first in what became a series of publications; a second series of just three chapbooks was published c. 1850 by William R Walker.

The publication 
John Ross edited the ten volumes of "The Songs of the Tyne", a series of booklets containing "local" songs by "local" Tyneside composers, some well known at the time, others not.<br/ >
A set of the original documents were kept in the archives of Newcastle University.<br/ >
They are published by the John Ross, Printer and Publisher, Royal Arcade, Newcastle.

Contents

See also 
 Geordie dialect words

References

External links
 Farne archive – click "Songs of the Tyne...... Nos.1, 4–10" and "go"
 Allan’s Illustrated Edition of Tyneside songs and readings

English folk songs
Songs related to Newcastle upon Tyne
Northumbrian folklore
Chapbooks
Song books